Marcelle Parkes (born 9 September 1997) is a New Zealand rugby union player. She has played for New Zealand internationally and for Matatū in the Super Rugby Aupiki competition. She has represented Wellington and Canterbury in the Farah Palmer Cup.

Rugby career

2018 
In 2018, Parkes was one of 28 players who were contracted by New Zealand Rugby for the Black Ferns. They were the first women to receive professional contracts in such a historic occasion. She made her international debut for New Zealand on 9 November against France at Toulon.

2019–22 
Parkes played against Canada, France and England at the 2019 Women's Rugby Super Series at San Diego. She signed with Matatū for the inaugural season of Super Rugby Aupiki in 2022.

References

External links 

 Black Ferns Profile

1997 births
Living people
New Zealand women's international rugby union players
New Zealand female rugby union players